Mads Vinding (born 7 December 1948, Copenhagen, Denmark) is a Danish jazz double-bassist.

Music career
Vinding began his professional career when he was 16 as the house bassist for Jazzhus Montmartre, a jazz club in Copenhagen. He has played on more than 800 recordings and more than 1000 Radio/TV shows.

Awards
 Best soloist, Nordring, 1978
 Ben Webster Prize, 1982
 Palæ Jazz Prize, 1997
 Launy Grøndahl's honorary prize, 2000
 Django d’Or, 2007

Gallery

Discography
 Mads Vinding Group (Cosmos Collector, 1977)
 The Kingdom (Stunt, 1998)
 Daddio Don (Stunt, 2000)
 Six Hands Three Minds One Heart (Stunt, 2002)
 Over the Rainbow (Cope, 2002)
 Two Basses (ZYX/Touche/Weaving, 2005)
 Abrikostræet (Calibrated, 2005)
 In Our Own Sweet Way (Storyville, 2009)
 Open Minds (Storyville, 2011)
 Composing (Storyville, 2015)
 Yesterdays (Stunt, 2017)

As sideman
With Yelena Eckemoff
 Cold Sun (L & H, 2010)
 Grass Catching the Wind (L & H, 2010)
With Kenny Drew
 Your Soft Eyes (Soul Note, 1981)
With Art Farmer
 Manhattan (Soul Note, 1981)
With Johnny Griffin
 Blues for Harvey (SteepleChase, 1973)
With Hank Jones
 Trio (Storyville, 1991)
 Hank Jones in Copenhagen - Live at Jazzhus Slukefter 1983 (Storyville, 2018) - trio with Shelly Manne, drums
With Duke Jordan
 Flight to Denmark (SteepleChase, 1974) - recorded in 1973
 Two Loves (SteepleChase, 1975) - recorded in 1973
 Truth (SteepleChase, 1983) - recorded in 1975
With Doug Raney
Guitar Guitar Guitar (SteepleChase, 1985)
With Idrees Sulieman
 Groovin' (SteepleChase, 1985)
With Kai Winding and Curtis Fuller
Giant Bones '80 (Sonet, 1980)

References

External links
official homepage

1948 births
Living people
Bebop double-bassists
Danish jazz bass guitarists
Danish jazz double-bassists
Male double-bassists
DR Big Band members
21st-century double-bassists
21st-century male musicians
Male jazz musicians